Ninjurin-1 is a protein that in humans is encoded by the NINJ1 gene.

References

Further reading